A bulawa (or bulava) is a ceremonial mace known in Poland, Russia, and Ukraine.

Bulawa, Buława, or Bulava may also refer to:
Buława, Opole Voivodeship (south-west Poland)
 Bulava (missile), Russian ballistic missile
Olga Buława, Polish model,  Miss Polski 2018

See also
Bulava of the President of Ukraine, a ceremonial mace